Dundas Data Visualization, Inc. is a software company specializing in data visualization and dashboard solutions. In addition to developing enterprise-level dashboard software (Dundas BI), Dundas offers a professional services group that provides consulting and training.

History
Dundas Data Visualization (formerly Dundas Software) was founded in 1992 in Toronto, Ontario, Canada.

After an early success with Dundas Chart in 2002, the company developed Dundas Gauge, Map, OLAP Chart, and Calendar controls, which were purchased by Microsoft in 2007 to become part of their Reporting Services, SharePoint, and .NET offerings.

In 2008, Dundas developed Dundas Dashboard as a dashboarding tool for enterprise organizations. Dundas Dashboard was supported until April 5, 2019

Dundas BI was released in 2014 as a next-generation end-to-end business intelligence and data analytics platform. Dundas BI provides all common functionality out-of-the-box without the need for code.  Public APIs are also provided for developers to customize and extend the platform.

In August of 2022, Dundas Data Visualization was acquired by insightsoftware.

See also
 .NET Framework
 Dundas BI

References

Software companies of Canada